Killaloe is a  coastal rural locality in the Shire of Douglas, Queensland, Australia.

Geography 
The south-eastern boundary of the locality are Packers Creek and the Dickson Inlet which lead to the Coral Sea, which forms the northern boundary of the locality. The Cassowary Range forms the south-western boundary of the locality. Numerous small creeks flow down from the range through the locality to the sea.

The Captain Cook Highway and the cane tramway to the Mossman sugar mill pass through the locality from south-east to north-west. Most of the developed land occurs on either side of these transport routes and the predominant land use is the growing of sugarcane. The land closer to the coast is not developed.

There is a waste transfer station on Killaloe Dump Road.

History 
The locality was named and bounded on 8 September 2000.

Education 
There are no schools in Killaloe, but there is a primary school in neighbouring Port Douglas. The nearest secondary school is Mossman State High School.

References 

Shire of Douglas
Coastline of Queensland
Localities in Queensland